Albert Earl Catherwood (23 May 1900 – 25 March 1988) was a Canadian politician and farmer. Catherwood served as a Progressive Conservative party member of the House of Commons of Canada. Born in Hagersville, Ontario, he was a farmer by career. He was also reeve of Walpole Township, Ontario in 1947 after being a councillor there from 1935 to 1943.

He was first elected to Parliament at the Haldimand riding in the 1949 general election. When the riding was dissolved in 1952, Catherwood did not seek re-election in the new Brant—Haldimand riding but instead let John Charlton stand as the Progressive Conservative candidate for the 1953 election. He died aged 87 in 1988 at West Haldimand General Hospital, where he had resided since 1986.

References

External links
 

1900 births
1988 deaths
Canadian farmers
Members of the House of Commons of Canada from Ontario
People from Haldimand County
Progressive Conservative Party of Canada MPs